Vuktyl is a town in the Komi Republic, Russia, located on the right bank of the Pechora River near its confluence with the ,  northeast of Syktyvkar, the capital of the republic. Population:

History
It was founded in 1968 and granted town status in 1989. A major oil pipeline runs from Vuktyl to Ukhta to Torzhok.

Administrative and municipal status
Within the framework of administrative divisions, the town of Vuktyl is, together with four rural-type settlement administrative territories (comprising ten rural localities), incorporated as the town of republic significance of Vuktyl—an administrative unit with the status equal to that of the districts. As a municipal division, the town of republic significance of Vuktyl is incorporated as Vuktyl Municipal District; the town of Vuktyl is incorporated within it as Vuktyl Urban Settlement. The four rural-type settlement administrative territories are incorporated into four rural settlements within the municipal district.

Transportation
The town is served by the Vuktyl Airport.

References

Notes

Sources

External links
Mojgorod.ru. Entry on Vuktyl 

Cities and towns in the Komi Republic
Cities and towns built in the Soviet Union
Populated places established in 1968